Sebastián Rosano Escobar (born 25 May 1987 in Rivera) is a Uruguayan footballer. He plays for C.D. Olimpia in the Liga Nacional de Honduras.

Rosano began his professional playing career with Montevideo Wanderersin Uruguay. In 2008, he had a short loan spell with Italian side Cagliari.

Later in 2008 Rosano joined Tigre of Argentina and in 2009 he joined Racing Club.

External links
 gazzetta.it 
 Sebastián Rosano – Argentine Primera statistics at Fútbol XXI  
 Sebastián Rosano at BDFA.com.ar 

Uruguayan footballers
People from Rivera Department
Montevideo Wanderers F.C. players
Cagliari Calcio players
Club Atlético Tigre footballers
Racing Club de Avellaneda footballers
Peñarol players
C.D. Olimpia players
Expatriate footballers in Italy
Expatriate footballers in Argentina
Expatriate footballers in Uruguay
Association football midfielders
Uruguayan sportspeople of Italian descent
1987 births
Living people